Acalolepta blairi is a species of beetle in the family Cerambycidae. It was described by Stephan von Breuning in 1935, originally under the genus Dihammus. It is known from Solomon Islands.

References

Acalolepta
Beetles described in 1935